Serrahima is a surname. Notable people with the surname include:

Juan Serrahima (1905–1959), Spanish sprinter
Lluís Serrahima (1931–2020), Spanish singer-songwriter
Marc Serrahima (born 1995), Spanish field hockey player